Patrick Damphier (born December 20, 1981), is an American singer-songwriter, multi-instrumentalist and record producer. Damphier has also toured as a member of The Mynabirds, Lionlimb, Paper Rival, Stone Jack Jones and Jessica Lea Mayfield. He has worked as a record producer for such acts as The Mynabirds, Aaron Lee Tasjan, Thayer Sarrano, Tim Easton, The Arcs, Paper Rival, Photo Ops, Houndmouth, Fences, Jessica Lea Mayfield, Mikaela Davis and Night Beds. Damphier is known to often provide substantial contributions as a multi-instrumentalist to the albums he produces. He has co-written with and/or had songs recorded by The Mynabirds, Paper Rival, Photo Ops, Jillette Johnson, Jessica Lea Mayfield, Aaron Lee Tasjan, Seratones, Johanna Samuels, Lola Kirke, Andrew Combs, Greta Morgan, Oh Mercy, Aaron Espe, Dylan LeBlanc, Lydia Luce, Fences, Judy Blank, Mikaela Davis and Sun Seeker.

References

1981 births
Living people
Singer-songwriters from New York (state)
Record producers from New York (state)
American multi-instrumentalists